The Song of Ceylon is a 1934 British documentary film directed by Basil Wright and produced by John Grierson for the Ceylon Tea Propaganda Board.

The film was shot on location in Ceylon (Sri Lanka) at the start of 1934 and completed at the GPO film studios in Blackheath, London.

Plot 
Ambitious documentary chronicling the cultural life and religious customs of the Sinhalese and the effects of advanced industrialism on such customs.

The first part of the film depicts the religious life of the Sinhalese, interlinking the Buddhist rituals with the natural beauty of Ceylon. Opening with a series of pans over palm leaves, we then gradually see people journey to Adam's Peak, a center of Buddhist pilgrimage for over two hundred years. This is continually inter-cut with images of surrounding natural beauty and a series of pans of a Buddhist statue.

Part two focuses on the working life of the Sinhalese, again continually stressing their intimate connection to the surrounding environment. We see people engaging in pottery, woodcarving and the building of houses, whilst children play.

The third part of the film introduces the arrival of modern communications systems into the fabric of this 'natural' lifestyle, heralded by experimental sounds and shots of industrial working practices.

Finally, in the last part of the film, we return to the cultural life of the Sinhalese, where people perform a traditional Kandyan dance. The film ends as it began, panning over palm trees.

Cast 
Lionel Wendt as Narrator (voice)

Critical response
Writing for The Spectator in 1935, Graham Greene described the film as "an example to all directors of perfect construction and the perfect application of montage", and noted that it "moves with the air of absolute certainty in its object and assurance in its method".

References

Colonial Film: Moving Images of the British Empire Entry for Song of Ceylon.
Screenonline Entry for Song of Ceylon.

External links 
Watch The Film Online at the Colonial Film: Moving Images of the British Empire  Website

Article on Basil Wright & Walter Leigh's use of sound in the film

1934 films
1934 short films
British short documentary films
British black-and-white films
Sri Lankan black-and-white films
Films directed by Basil Wright
1930s short documentary films
Sponsored films
1934 documentary films
Black-and-white documentary films
GPO Film Unit films
1930s English-language films
1930s British films